Canibália tour was a concert tour by the Brazilian singer Daniela Mercury, beginning on August 7, on Citibank Hall, São Paulo. Eight days after, where she made another concert at Citibank Hall, she went to Rio de Janeiro and then took the tour to Portugal, where she performed in five cities, right after, back to the Latin American, European and North American. The tour counts with the participation of dancers, who danced the choreographies developed by Jorge Silva, recognized choreographer from Bahia. Gringo Cardia, the developer of the five covers of the album Canibália, was responsible for the elaboration of the scenario of the tour. On March 10, 2011, Mercury began her new tour Canibália: Ritmos do Brasil Tour to promote her new album of de same name recorded live in Copacabana Beach, in Rio de Janeiro.

Set list 
"Bênção Do Samba" (Sambas Medley):
"Na Baixa Do Sapateiro"
"O Samba Da Minha Terra"
"Samba Da Bênção"
"Preta"
"O Mais Belo dos Belos (A Verdade do Ilê/O Charme da Liberdade)"
"Por Amor ao Ilê"
"Ilê Pérola Negra"
"O Que Será (Que Será?)" (Chico Buarque cover)
"O Reggae e o Mar"/"Batuque"
"O Que É Que A Baiana Tem?" (Carmen Miranda cover)
"Nobre Vagabundo"
"Minas com Bahia"
"A Vida É Um Carnaval"
"Quero A Felicidade"
"Rapunzel"
"Trio Em Transe"
"Vai Chover"
"Elétrica"
"Oyá Por Nós"
"Olodum É Rei"
"Swing Da Cor"
"Tico Tico no Fubá" (Carmen Miranda cover)
"Quero Ver O Mundo Sambar"
"Maimbê Dandá"
"O Canto Da Cidade"

Tour dates

References

2009 concert tours
2010 concert tours
2011 concert tours
2012 concert tours
2013 concert tours
Daniela Mercury concert tours